Calpurnia aurea is a Southern African tree belonging to the family Fabaceae, occurring along the coastal regions from the south-eastern Cape northwards and inland to the central Transvaal, with an isolated population in eastern Zimbabwe. Mostly found as a small tree up to 4 m, but under forest conditions reaching heights of 15 m. This species produces abundant sprays of bright yellow flowers. Leaves are pinnately compound with a terminal leaflet (imparipinnate). Pods are thin and papery, straw-coloured and about 10 cm in length.

References 

Podalyrieae
Trees of South Africa
Flora of Zimbabwe